Asathal is a 2001 Indian Tamil-language comedy film written and directed by P. Vasu.  The film featured Sathyaraj and Ramya Krishnan in the leading roles.  Produced by Mala Cine Creations and featuring music composed by Bharadwaj, the film was released on 18 May 2001.

The movie is a remake of 1990 Malayalam movie Thoovalsparsham which was earlier remade in Tamil as Thayamma and in Telugu as Chinnari Muddula Papa. Thoovalsparsham was itself was based on the 1987 English movie Three Men and a Baby which in turn was based on the 1985 French movie Three Men and a Cradle.

Cast
 Sathyaraj as Vetri
 Ramya Krishnan as Gowri
 Swathi as Catherine
 Vadivelu as Venugopal
 Ramesh Khanna as Victor
 Ajay Rathnam as Jayaraj
 Manivannan as Lawyer

Production
The film was produced by S. Rajaram, a theatre owner and film distributor under his production house Mala Cine Combines.  He signed on P. Vasu to write and direct the comedy film, with the director collaborating with Sathyaraj again after several previous successful ventures.  Scenes which showed the characters in a house were filmed in a bungalow at Neelankarai, Chennai. Sathyaraj worked on Asathal alongside two other ventures Kunguma Pottu Gounder and the later-shelved Mr. Narathar.

Soundtrack
The music was composed by Bharadwaj, while lyrics were written by Gangai Amaran, Kalaikumar and Snehan.

Release
Malathi Rangarajan of The Hindu gave the film a mixed review, noting that "Certain scenes are too contrived - the aim is humour but they only tend to irritate", while adding "the screenplay is fast-paced, the dialogue is crisp, it is the story that lags behind".  Reviewer Balaji Balasubramaniam also gave the film a negative review, remarking that "Vasu has lost his touch and run out of ideas in comedies".  Another critic noted "A full-length comedy, the narration is fast-paced, the script crisp, and it manages to hold one's attention for the most part."

The film's story later inspired Sajid Khan's 2007 Hindi comedy film Heyy Babyy which featured Akshay Kumar and Vidya Balan.

References

2001 films
2000s Tamil-language films
Indian comedy films
Films directed by P. Vasu
Films scored by Bharadwaj (composer)
Indian remakes of French films
Tamil remakes of Malayalam films
2001 comedy films